Stanislav Kubíček (born 23 May 1940) is a former international speedway rider from Czechoslovakia.

Speedway career 
Kubíček reached the final of the Speedway World Team Cup in the 1963 Speedway World Team Cup. He has also reached the final of the Individual Speedway Long Track World Championship on two occasions in 1974 and 1976.

World final appearances

World Team Cup
 1963 -  Vienna, Stadion Wien (with Antonín Kasper Sr. / Miroslav Šmíd / Luboš Tomíček Sr. - 2nd - 27pts (7)

World Longtrack Championship
 1976 –  Marianske Lazne 17th - 1pt

Individual Ice Speedway World Championship
1966 -  2 rounds, 8th - 27 pts
1967 -  3 rounds, 10th - 30 pts
1968 -  2 rounds, 14th - 13pts
1970 -  Nässjö, 15th - 1pt
1974 –  Nässjö, 11th – 5pts
1975 –  Moscow, 15th – 5pts
1976 –  Assen, 11th – 9pts

References 

1940 births
Possibly living people
Czech speedway riders